The End of the World Route (Spanish: Ruta del Fin del Mundo) is a Chilean touristic scenic route located in the Magallanes and Chilean Antarctic Region, the most southerly region of the country. The term "end of the world" refers to Chile being the southernmost country in the world, which is why Chilean Patagonia, the southernmost natural region of the country and at the same time, the southernmost part of the American continent.

Tourist attractions 
Attractions that includes this route are varied, among which the visit to the Torres del Paine National Park, the Cueva del Milodón Natural Monument (Milodon's Cave), the penguin sighting in Magdalena Island, as well as other species of the Chilean wildlife stand out. In a broad sense, the route also includes the Carretera Austral, which begins south of the Los Lagos Region and crosses through the Aysén Region. Additionally, the route includes the passage through the cities of Punta Arenas (regional capital), where cruise ships disembark with tourists throughout the year and has a free economic zone; Puerto Williams and Puerto Toro, the southernmost human settlement in the Americas.

Gallery

References

Tourist attractions in Magallanes Region
Tourism in Chile
Roads in Chile